Ayman Younes (Arabic: أيمن يونس) (born 20 February 1964) is an Egyptian retired footballer who played as a midfielder and forward. He played for Zamalek,  he scored the fastest goal in Egyptian Premier League on 1990 against Suez SC after 13 seconds.

International career
He represented Egypt in the 1988 African Cup of Nations.

Honours

Club
Zamalek SC
 Egyptian Premier League: 1984, 1988, 1992, 1993
 Egypt Cup: 1988
 African Cup of Champions Clubs: 1984, 1986, 1993
 Afro-Asian Club Championship: 1987

References

1964 births
Living people
Egyptian footballers
Egypt international footballers
Zamalek SC players
1988 African Cup of Nations players
Egyptian Premier League players
Association football forwards
Association football midfielders